Gerontius Glacier is a glacier flowing north from the Elgar Uplands into Tufts Pass in northern Alexander Island, Antarctica. It was so named by the UK Antarctic Place-Names Committee in 1977, association with the nearby uplands, from The Dream of Gerontius, a work for chorus, solo voices and orchestra by Edward Elgar.

See also

 List of glaciers in the Antarctic
 Clarsach Glacier
 Lennon Glacier
 Sedgwick Glacier

References

Glaciers of Alexander Island